Neighbors is The Reels fourth studio album and was released in 1988 on Regular Records through Festival Records. It consists of cover versions of classic Australian songs by well-known artists and was produced by Dave Mason, Craig Hooper and Bruce Brown. It was recorded at Festival Studios and Alberts Digital Studios, Sydney Australia and mixed at Alberts Digital Studios. To promote the album's release, the band enlisted the help of Rolf Harris to narrate The Story of The Reels, a 40-minute promotional cassette supplied to radio stations.

Reviewed in the Sydney Morning Herald at the time of its release, it was described as "far from the best thing The Reels have produced. The Reels are either unaware their own material is in demand, or they could not care less what the public wants to hear."

Track listing

Charts

References

1988 albums
Covers albums
The Reels albums
Festival Records albums